Cychrus sars is a species of ground beetle in the subfamily of Carabinae. It was described by Imura & Haeckel in 2003.

References

sars
Beetles described in 2003